The 1880 United States House of Representatives elections in Florida were held November 2 for the 47th Congress.  These elections were held at the same time as the presidential election and the election for governor.

Background
The Democrats had gained complete control of Florida's congressional delegation in 1878, although the results of the election in the 2nd district were successfully challenged, so that a single Republican represented Florida in the House for the last two months of the 46th Congress.

Election results
Incumbent Noble A. Hull (D) of the  did not run for re-election.

1st District 

Incumbent Robert H.M. Davidson easily defeated Republican nominee George W. Witherspoon with 57.46% of the vote.

In some tabulation from the 2nd precinct in Leon County, 127 votes for Robert H.M. Davidson are erroneously reported for Livingston W. Bethel.

Results

2nd District

Results

Contested election
For the fourth time in a row, the election in the 2nd district was contested. Republican Horatio Bisbee, Jr. successfully contested the election of Democrat Jesse J. Finley and was seated June 1, 1882.  Bisbee had also been on the winning side of an electoral dispute after the 1878 election, and on the losing side of an electoral dispute in 1876, while Finley had been on the winning side of electoral disputes in 1874 and 1876.

See also
1880 United States presidential election in Florida
United States House of Representatives elections, 1880
1880 Florida gubernatorial election

References

1880
Florida
United States House of Representatives